Benjamin Peredur Jones-Perrott (4 August 1894 - 16 July 1973) was a Welsh Anglican priest in the 20th century who rose to become Archdeacon of Wrexham and afterwards Archdeacon Emeritus.

Jones-Perrott was educated at St David's College, Lampeter. He was ordained Deacon in 1916; and Priest in 1917. After a curacy in Chirk he held incumbencies at Bwlch-y-cibau and Ruabon. He was also Cursal Canon of St Asaph Cathedral from 1954 until 1957.

References

Alumni of the University of Wales, Lampeter
20th-century Welsh Anglican priests
Archdeacons of Wrexham